Marcin Czarnik (born 23 March 1976, Oświęcim, Poland) is a Polish film and theatre actor, most notable for appearing as Feigenbaum in the Academy Award-winning film Son of Saul. Graduating from the Theatre Academy in Warsaw in 2000, he performed at the Polish Theatre in Wrocław from 2002 to 2004, and then again in 2006, and at the Wybrzeże Theatre in Gdańsk for a brief period from 2004 to 2005. In 2011, he was awarded the Medal for Merit to Culture – Gloria Artis.

References

1976 births
Living people
Polish male actors
People from Oświęcim